Ian McCutcheon, M.D. (born 1959), is an American neurosurgeon and author/editor of many papers covering many facets of neurosurgery.

References

Canadian neurosurgeons
Living people
1959 births
Yale University alumni
McGill University Faculty of Medicine alumni